Sun Gangs is the third album by The Veils, released on 6 April 2009 in both CD and LP formats. Finn Andrews has described it as "a very modern mixture of prayers, love letters and personal record keeping". Sun Gangs was produced by Graham Sutton, with the exception of the opening track "Sit Down by the Fire", produced by Bernard Butler. No official singles were released to promote the album though 1-track promos of "Three Sisters" and "The Letter" were sent out to radio stations in late February, 2009.

Track list 

All songs written by Finn Andrews.

CD/LP (RTRADCD382/RTRADLP382)
 "Sit Down by the Fire" – 3:51
 "Sun Gangs" – 3:43
 "The Letter" – 3:31
 "Killed by the Boom" – 2:49
 "It Hits Deep" – 5:27
 "Three Sisters" – 2:32
 "The House She Lived in" – 3:48
 "Scarecrow" – 3:31
 "Larkspur" – 8:33
 "Begin Again" – 3:15

Personnel 

Finn Andrews – vocals, guitar, piano
Sophia Burn – bass
Henning Dietz – drums, percussion
Dan Raishbrook – guitar, screeches, drone
Basia Bulat – backing vocals on "Scarecrow" and "The House She Lived in"
Edward Harcourt – hammond on "Three Sisters", "It Hits Deep" and "Killed by the Boom"
Catherine A.D. – backing vocals on "Sit Down by the Fire"
James Duncan – scattered ohms
Dina Beamish – cello
Kristen Kilingel – viola
Brian Wright – violin
Margot Chassagne – violin

2009 albums
Albums produced by Bernard Butler
Rough Trade Records albums
The Veils albums